The Parliamentary Under-Secretary of State for Primary and Public Health is a position in the Department of Health and Social Care in the Government of the United Kingdom. The role has previously been known as the Minister of State for Public Health.

History 
The Parliamentary Under-Secretary of State for Health and Social Security worked at the Department of Health and Social Security. The future Prime Minister John Major held this office. The office was known as Parliamentary Under-Secretary of State for Health from 1987 to 1990.

Nicola Blackwood lost her seat in the snap 2017 general election and was replaced as a minister by Steve Brine.

During the COVID-19 pandemic in the United Kingdom, the minister was placed in charge of public health policy. The office of Parliamentary Under-Secretary of State for COVID-19 Vaccine Deployment was created later and was held by Nadhim Zahawi from 28 November 2020 to 15 September 2021. Zahawi was briefly shadowed by Neale Hanvey of the Scottish National Party (SNP) but Hanvey had to resign following his support for a defamation case against a parliamentary colleague, Kirsty Blackman. In February 2021, Zahawi announced schools in England would reopen on 8 March.

In the 2021 British cabinet reshuffle, responsibilities for vaccines were merged with those for public health and given to Maggie Throup in the office of Parliamentary Under-Secretary of State for Vaccines and Public Health.

Responsibilities 
The minister is responsible for the following:

 COVID-19:
 supply (PPE)
 shielding and vulnerable groups
 vaccine deployment
 health improvement
 health inequalities
 prevention
 primary care
 gender identity services
 major diseases
 community health
 lead minister for crisis response
 sponsorship of PHE and FSA

List of Ministers of Public Health

Parliamentary Under-Secretary of State for COVID-19 Vaccine Deployment

Parliamentary Under-Secretary of State for Patient Safety and Primary Care

References

See also 
 Health minister
 COVID-19 vaccination programme in the United Kingdom
 COVID-19 pandemic in the United Kingdom
 List of government ministers of the United Kingdom

Health ministers of the United Kingdom
Department of Health and Social Care
Health in the United Kingdom
COVID-19 pandemic in the United Kingdom and government structures